Just the Ticket is a 1998 film directed by Richard Wenk. It stars Andy García and Andie MacDowell. Garcia was also the producer. The film was originally titled A Piece of Cake.

Plot 
Gary Starke (Garcia), desperate to get his girlfriend Linda (MacDowell) back, goes to confession to seek guidance but doesn't get the help he seeks. He is a NYC ticket scalper who "works the street".

Linda won't take his calls, so Gary shows up at her sales job. He earns a dinner date with her by selling a 60 inch TV to someone who was only window-shopping.

Gary plans to make one last big score, to win Linda back and straighten out his life. Believing his chance rests on an opportunity to scalp a large stack of tickets to see the Pope at Yankee Stadium. Gary comes against 'Casino', a FL scalper who undercuts him.

Meanwhile, at Linda's culinary course a NYT food critic asks her to cater an upscale dinner party after trying her dish. So, instead of their date, Gary jumps in to help. She's way underpaid for the meal at the upperclass party, so they retaliate by ruining the dishes. That evening, they spend the night together.

The next day Gary is off seeking Pope tickets. He and the other scalpers get thrown in jail. While there, he tells them his lookout Benny Moran, used to be in the corner for boxing champion Joe Frazier.

When Gary is released, he hurries to Linda's, only to meet Alan, an exterminator and her new boyfriend. He listens to advice from pregnant, ex drug addict 'Cyclops', to try to get a social security number. Unfortunately he can't without a birth certificate.

Gary finds Max offering 200 tickets for 5,000 if he can get it for Saturday. So he works hard scalping Broadway tickets. Caught by undercover cops, Casino helps out, warning that it's a one-time deal as it's his turf now and most everyone works for him.

Sitting opposite Linda's building, she comes out to tell Gary she's leaving for culinary school in Paris in three weeks. After some finagling, he buys the tickets to scalp, although warned about Max.

Linda's large family throws her a congratulatory party, a combined birthday and going away to culinary school celebration. Gary is warmly welcomed by everyone, and is quietly told she dumped the exterminator. They soon find out he has provided a film montage of loving moments between them.

Linda walks out mid-projection, with Gary following with a non-going away present, their trophy for best couple at a picnic. He again tries talking about his plans for them. Admitting she has loved him completely for years, but his many fantasies have never come through, so she needs to focus on the future.

In the city, Benny talks with Linda. He tells her that Gary has been intently working on something, and asks her to swear to do something for him. Then we see Gary in a realtor's cutting a deal on a two year lease. Afterwards, seeking out Benny who was with his dog, he has passed.

At Benny's small funeral, Frazier comes to pay his respects, shocking the guys, as they hadn't believed he'd worked with him. Linda has also come, she tells Gary Benny had asked her to promise to say yes to anything Gary asks. So he requests she be at an address at 9 a.m. on Monday.

Arriving home Gary finds Cyclops, who warns him that the tickets Max sold him were taken from a church, and the cops are looking for him. On the day of the Pope's address, dressed as a nun, Gary keeps the tickets and money in a hollowed out bible. Casino snitches on him, and although he transforms into a priest, he is caught. The evidence is lost in the scuffle.

As the scalping money is gone, Gary's not at the 9 a.m. appointment at the premises. An insurance rep appears on his doorstep instead with a 56,000 payment from Benny's life insurance policy as well as his birth certificate.

Gary sets up the lease, fully stocking it with dishes etc. Discovering Linda's at her mom's, he gets her to detour her airport taxi to the premises. Entering, she sees the signed lease and his social security card. Months later, we see the couple happily operating a thriving restaurant.

Cast 
 Andy Garcia as Gary Starke
 Andie MacDowell as Linda Palinski
 Richard Bradford as Benny Moran
 Alice Drummond as Lady with Cash
 Fred Asparagus as Zeus
 Louis Mustillo as Harry the Head
 Anita Elliott as  Refund Lady at the Met
 Patrick Breen as San Diego Vinnie
 Laura Harris as Alice / 'Cyclops'
 Don Novello as	Tony
 Ron Leibman as Barry the Book
 Michael Willis as TV Customer
 Jack Cafferty as Newscaster
 Molly Wenk as Catholic Schoolgirl Fanny
 Daniella Garcia-Lorido as Catholic Schoolgirl Lucy
 Abe Vigoda as Arty	 
 Andre B. Blake as Casino
 Michael P. Moran as Fat Max
 Ronald Guttman as Culinary Director
 Helen Carey as Mrs. Bennett, New York Times Food Critic
 Bobo Lewis as Mrs. Dolmatch
 Paunita Nichols as Rhonda
 Irene Worth as Mrs. Haywood
 Lenny Venito as Stanley
 Richard Wenk as Good Call Johnny D.J.
 George Palermo as Undercover Cop
 Anthony DeSando as Kenny Paliski
 Elizabeth Ashley as Mrs. Paliski
 Sully Boyar as Uncle Tony
 Joe Frazier as himself
 Alfredo Álvarez Calderón as Yankee Stadium Security Chief
 Eugene Greytak as The Pope (as Gene Greytak)
 Bill Irwin as Ray Charles

Reception 
Just the Ticket was poorly received by critics. It holds a rating of 23% on Rotten Tomatoes from 13 reviews.

See also 
 Ticket resale

References

External links 
 
 
 

1998 films
1998 romantic comedy films
Films directed by Richard Wenk
Films with screenplays by Richard Wenk
American romantic comedy films
United Artists films
Films produced by Gary Lucchesi
1990s English-language films
1990s American films